Jung Myung-seok is a South Korean religious cult leader and convicted rapist. He is the founder and leader of Providence, also known as Christian Gospel Mission (CGM) or Jesus Morning Star (JMS), a Christian new religious movement that is commonly referred to as a Christian sect or cult.

Jung is a self-proclaimed messiah. He founded Providence in 1980 and the religious group is headquartered in WolMyeongdong, South Korea, and the group has since expanded to Taiwan, Japan, Hong Kong, Australia and other countries. Jung Myung-seok was convicted of rape by the Supreme Court of Korea and was sentenced to 10 years imprisonment between 2008 to 2018. He was again indicted in South Korea on October 28, 2022, for sexually assaulting two female followers between 2018 to 2022.

He is also known by the names of Joshua Jung, Joshua Lee and Pastor Joshua. His family name is often also transliterated in English as Jeong.

Early life 
Jung Myung-seok was born in 1945. He is also known by the names of Joshua Jung, Joshua Lee and Pastor Joshua. According to an interview with Providence's Director of External Affairs in 2020, Jung graduated from the Methodist Wesley Theological Seminary in 1983, completed an executive management program at the graduate school of Administration, Chungnam University  in 1998 and received an honorary doctorate of philosophy from Open International University under UNESCO (Sri Lanka) in 2001.

Providence

Founding of the Providence movement (1980–1998) 
Jung Myung-seok joined as a member of the Unification Church in 1974, where he taught briefly in 1978. In 1980, he founded the Ae-chun Church or Church of Providence. Its religious events are held in university football stadiums, sometimes in the form of football matches. JMS recruits elite Korean students on campuses through sports and a variety of student interest clubs.

Self-imposed exile and criminal convictions (1999–2008) 
Jung Myung-seok fled South Korea in 1999 after Korean television broadcaster Seoul Broadcasting System aired its expose on the alleged sex crimes of Jung on March 20, 1999. He hid in Hong Kong and Mainland China for years before he was extradited from Beijing, China in February 2008 to face the charges in South Korea.

While Jung was on the run, Providence (then known mostly as JMS) continued publishing Jung’s sermons online, providing telephone counseling and holding overseas events for their followers. 

According to former Providence members, Jung traveled often to Japan to proselytize until 2002. He was said to have stayed in his followers homes in Osaka and Chiba prefectures, where he gathered at least 10 female followers daily and sexually assaulted them "under the pretext of health checks". Japanese female followers were said to be brought overseas for rendezvous with Jung and told not to reveal these trips to others, or they would be condemned to hell.

Besides being prosecuted in South Korea, Jung was also indicted by Taiwanese District Prosecutor's Office on charges of rape in 2003 but failed to appear in court. He remains wanted by the Taiwan Taipei District Prosecutor's Office until the arrest warrant expires in 2027.

Jung was arrested in Hong Kong in July 2003 for overstaying his visa, but was released three days later on bail. When Hong Kong authorities approved extradition to Korea, Jung fled the extradition hearing. An Interpol Red Notice was issued on Jung in 2003 for multiple counts of fraud, sexual crimes and embezzlement. In 2006, South Korean authorities put Jung on an international wanted list on rape charges, and there were nine charges and accusations against him filed to South Korean prosecutors by October 2006.

After learning that Jung had fled to China, the South Korean government officially asked China in November 2006 to extradite him. In February 2007, Interpol requested for the fingerprints of Jung from South Korea, who was then thought to be in Costa Rican territories under false documentation.

Jung was reportedly hiding in Qianshan near Anshan, Liaoning Province, China after escaping Hong Kong in 2003. After about 8 years on the run, Chinese Ministry of Public Security announced that Jung had been arrested in Beijing by Chinese police on May 1, 2007. Jung was questioned by the Chinese authorities for sexual assault he allegedly committed in China. The Liaoning Provincial Higher People's Court ruled in September 2007 to extradite Jung, a decision upheld by the Supreme People's Court. He was extradited back to South Korea to stand charges in February 2008. Jung was also charged with fraud and embezzlement of church funds.

Seoul prosecutors indicted him on five charges of sexually assaulting five female followers from 2001 to 2006 in Malaysia, Hong Kong and China. Jung was initially convicted on three counts of rape, acquitted on one count, and one case was dismissed because the victim dropped the charges. He was sentenced to six years of imprisonment in 2008. An appeal court added four more years to his sentence in 2009, convicting him on all four charges of rape between 2001 and 2006.

Growing the Providence movement from jail (2008–2018) 
In April 2009, Jung Myung-seok was convicted of 4 counts of rape by the Supreme Court of Korea and was sentenced to 10 years imprisonment. During his incarceration between 2008 to 2018, Jung's sermons and directives were delivered through visitors to the prison and through his successor Jung Jo-eun (real name Kim Ji-seon).

Members of the Providence Church, now mostly known as Christian Gospel Movement (CGM), tried to downplay their religious ties when proselytizing. They often recruit members from shopping malls and university campuses in Taiwan, Japan and Australia. Other new members are recruited from student clubs in universities (e.g. modeling, cheer leading, groups focused on sustainable development goals issues), before they are introduced to the Providence doctrine and CGM church services with Jung's sermons. According to former members, some female followers are then introduced as spiritual brides for the leader and coerced or forced into sexual relationships with their perceived messiah.

In 2014, Australian public broadcaster SBS aired a feature Inside Providence: The Korean church cult led by a convicted rapist, in which former Australian members described how they were encouraged to write letters, send photos of themselves in bikinis and visit Jung in jail. Members are encouraged to ignore news on Jung's imprisonment and alleged crimes, claiming he is a messiah suffering for them. In a 2023 interview, a source confirmed that members were indoctrinated to believe Jung was wrongfully accused.

Jung was released from jail on February 18, 2018.

2018–present 
Jung Myung-seok was indicted in South Korea on October 28, 2022, for sexually assaulting a follower from Hong Kong and sexually abusing an Australian follower.

On March 13, 2023, it was reported that Providence's second-in-command Jung Jo-eun, stated that there were seven people from the church who were sexually assaulted by Jung Myung-seok, of which two were minors. She also said that a Providence member said Jung Myung-seok gave false testimony. Jung Jo-Eun said in a recorded video that she had tried to prevent female followers from entering within a 3-meter radius next to Jung Myung-seok.

See also 

 List of messiah claimants
 Religion in South Korea
 Unification Church

References 

Self-declared messiahs
Living people
People from South Chungcheong Province
South Korean religious leaders
Founders of new religious movements
South Korean rapists
Providence (religious movement)